Tungusic may refer to:
The Tungusic languages
The Tungusic peoples, people who speak a Tungusic language